Michael Trempenau (born 14 January 1961), better known as Mike Tramp, is a Danish singer best known for his work with the glam metal band White Lion. Since 1998, he has also released several solo albums. In 2012, Tramp went on a solo acoustic tour releasing acoustic albums in both 2013 and 2014. He returned with a full band lineup in 2015 and in 2017, released the album Maybe Tomorrow, which charted at number 1 in Denmark.

Biography

1976–1982: Early years
Trempenau was born and raised in Vesterbro, Copenhagen, with his mother, Doris, and two brothers, Dennis and Kim. He started his musical career singing in Vesterbro Ungdomsgård, a youth group club in Copenhagen, and appears on their first album: Vi lever på Vesterbro (1974). In 1976, Trempenau, now known professionally as Tramp, joined the pop band Mabel as the lead singer. Mabel released five studio albums and were very popular in Denmark and Spain, with Mike receiving "teen idol" status. In 1978, Mabel won the Danish Song Contest with the song "Boom Boom" and represented Denmark in the Eurovision Song Contest 1978 that same year. Later, Mabel moved to Spain and became Studs, releasing a debut self-titled album in 1981 and then moved to New York City and became Danish Lions in 1982. After recording demos, the band returned home to Denmark, however, Tramp decided to remain in America.

1983–1992: White Lion
Tramp met Vito Bratta and formed White Lion in 1983; the band became very successful in the mid-1980s to early '90s. White Lion released their debut album, Fight to Survive, in 1985. The band achieved success with their number 8 hit "Wait" and number 3 hit "When the Children Cry" from their second album, the triple-platinum selling Pride. The band enjoyed continued success with their third album, Big Game, which achieved gold status, and their fourth album, Mane Attraction, which they supported with a tour. White Lion disbanded in 1992; their first compilation album, The Best of White Lion, was released not long after.

1992–1998: Freak of Nature
After White Lion, Tramp went on to form the hard rock band Freak of Nature. The follow-up was significantly darker and harder than White Lion. The band released three albums between 1993 and 1998: Freak of Nature, Gathering of Freaks, and Outcasts. The band shared stages with Helloween and Dio in Europe in 1993. Freak of Nature eventually disbanded in 1996.

1998–2004: Solo career
Following Freak of Nature, Tramp began a solo career, releasing his debut album as a solo artist in 1998 titled Capricorn. The album featured former Freak of Nature bandmates, guitarist Kenny Korade and bass player Jerry Best. Former White Lion bass guitarist James LoMenzo performed backing vocals on the album.
The song "Better Off" was released as Tramp's debut solo single and features his first solo music video. The album also features the singles "Already Gone", "If I Live Tomorrow", and "Take a Little Time".

It would be five years before Tramp returned to the studio to record his follow-up album, Recovering the Wasted Years, during which time he would move to Australia, with the aim of raising his son away from the rigors of big city life and to plan his next career move. Recovering the Wasted Years was released in 2002 and featured the singles "Living a Lie" and "Endless Highway" both featuring live music videos.

In 2003, Tramp followed-up with his third album, More to Life Than This, which he once again produced himself but relied on producer/engineer Flemming Rasmussen (Metallica) to engineer and mix the sessions in his very own Sweet Silence Studios. The album's title track, "More to Life Than This", and "Don't Want to Say Good Night" were both released as singles. A music video made in Australia was released for the song "Lay Down My Life for You".
Also in 2003, Tramp released the double-disc live album Rock 'N' Roll Alive, which features Tramp performing live versions of songs from White Lion, Freak of Nature, and his solo albums.
 
In 2004, Tramp released the solo album Songs I Left Behind.

2004–2008: The new White Lion
Tramp also reformed White Lion with a new lineup under the name "Tramp's White Lion" (aka White Lion II) due to legal issues with former members. The band played and re-recorded White Lion songs touring and releasing a boxset titled "The Bootleg Series" in 2004 and a double-live CD entitled Rocking the USA in 2005.

In 2006 Tramp's White Lion toured Europe in November and December with British band Crimes of Passion. In 2007 a White Lion compilation The Definitive Rock Collection was released and the band was set for a summer tour with Poison and Ratt only to be dropped by the tour promoter after ex-White Lion guitarist Vito Bratta threatened to take legal action over the band name. Eventually Tramp was able to use the original band name again.

White Lion recorded a new studio album called Return of the Pride, which was released on 14 March 2008. The band was now once again simply known as White Lion.

2009–2011: The Rock 'N' Roll Circuz
Following the release of Return of the Pride, Tramp faced a tumultuous time of professional indecision as he tried to decide between continuing his solo career or pouring his energy into White Lion.
In October 2009, Tramp released a new solo studio album titled Mike Tramp & The Rock 'N' Roll Circuz, which was also now the name of his solo band. The album was initially intended to be the next new White Lion album but a new solo band was formed instead. The album peaked at number 16 on the Danish top 40 Hitlisten albums chart on 16 October 2009. The album features the singles "All of My Life" and "Come On", for which a music video was also made.

In April 2011, Tramp released the solo album Stand Your Ground featuring the singles "Distance" and "Hymn to Ronnie", a tribute song to former Heaven & Hell and Black Sabbath vocalist Ronnie James Dio, who died on 16 May 2010 after a six-month-long battle with stomach cancer.

2012–2014: Acoustic
In 2012, Tramp began recording another solo album. The result, Cobblestone Street, was released on 8 April 2013 on Target Records following a successful acoustic tour of Europe in autumn 2012. During the tour, Tramp traveled across Europe playing 40 shows, while driving and doing everything by himself.
The album reached number 21 on the Danish Hitlisten albums chart and features the first single "New Day" which was released on 18 February 2013. The track "Revolution" was released as the second single for the album.
In March 2013, Tramp supported Beth Hart for several concerts in France. To support Cobblestone Street, Mike toured Europe, including France, Switzerland, Spain, Denmark, Sweden, Norway, Germany, Belgium, Holland, Turkey and the UK. The tour ended at Le Forum in Vaureal.

Tramp embarked on a US tour and his first ever acoustic tour of the country in summer 2013.

While promoting his solo album Tramp announced in several interviews that there would no longer be a White Lion of any kind, including the new White Lion or any possible reunions.

To wrap up 2013 Tramp released the Christmas single "The Way It Was Before" which is a more serious track compared to most other festive songs. The single was also inspired by events from 9/11 was released in Europe via Target Records on 11 November.

Mike Tramp has announced his return to the US for the spring of 2014. The tour started on 19 March in Hollywood, California at the Whisky A Go Go and continued into May. The tour also included an extended stay on the Monsters Of Rock Cruise 2014 in front of a big crowd.

In June 2014, Tramp released the single "Trust in Yourself" featuring a music video directed by his son Dylan. The song is the first single from his upcoming new solo album "Museum".

The album Museum was released on 18 August 2014 and follows the musical steps of his last album "Cobblestone Street".
The album charted on the Danish Hitlisten albums chart at number 3. The song "Freedom" was released as the second single from the album.

Tramp gave four release concerts at the Zeppelin Bar, Café and Venue in Copenhagen. The four concerts took place on 14–17 August. All the concerts were completely sold out. Tramp delivered outstanding performances with special themes and different set list every night to a dedicated crowd.

On 22 August 2014, Mike Tramp started his extensive European tour playing shows in Germany, Belgium, the Netherlands, and the UK.
The last concert of the European tour was at the Bremen Theater in Copenhagen which was a trio show.

2015–2018: Band of Brothers
In February 2015, Tramp signed a worldwide album deal with Target Records, with the announcement his next album would be released in August. Tramp also confirmed that there would be no more White Lion. Also in February 2015, Tramp played two concerts in Russia for the first time ever.

In March 2015, Tramp confirmed he was at work on the follow-up to 2014's Museum. He also stated that the material would be classic rock, more akin to his 1997 debut Capricorn, without the acoustic elements that featured in his recent output. He revealed a return to a full-band lineup working with longtime producer, engineer and guitarist Soren Andersen, their Rock'n'Roll Circus drummer Morten Hellborn, keyboardist Morten Buchholz and bassist Jesper Haugaard. The album was said to be released in August.

After the highly successful US tour earlier in 2014, Tramp embarked on another intimate acoustic solo tour across the US in the spring of 2015 and for the first time visited Canada as well. Tramp played on the Monsters of Rock Cruise and the Monsters of Rock Hangover Cruise.

Tramp announced that his studio album Nomad would be released internationally on 28 August 2015. Tramp stated: "Each previous album gave me the freedom to follow the songs wherever they wanted to go, and with 'Nomad' my vision was clear as a bell, once again I just had to be who I am."

In July 2015, Tramp released the single "High Like a Mountain" and in August Tramp released the radio single and music video "Give It All You Got". The video was filmed and edited in Copenhagen, with both tracks taken from his album Nomad.

Nomad was released on 28 August 2015 via Target Records. The album reached number 21 on the Danish Hitlisten albums chart. Following the album, Tramp embarked with the young Danish band Lucer on a European tour in the late summer, visiting Denmark, Germany, Sweden, England, Netherlands, Belgium, Northern Ireland, Ireland, Scotland, Wales, France and Switzerland. The tour ended at the night on fire festival in Karlsruhe.

In 2016, Tramp announced several solo and band shows in Denmark where the Danish band Lucer played for him as a support band and as Tramp's background band. In March 2016, Tramp played a benefit show for people with cancer in Lingen, Germany.

In May 2016, following up on Nomads success and the award for Classic Rock Album of the Year at the High Voltage Rock Awards, Tramp released the single "Stay", which like previous singles was played heavily on Danish national radio. "Stay" was released with a video that shows Tramp in total isolation, living the life of a forest worker in the Scandinavian woods.

On 13 May, Tramp played on Nordic Noise Festival in Denmark. Esbjerg Rock Festival, Sweden Rock Festival and Väsby Rock Festival will follow in 2016. In the summer of 2016, Tramp toured in the USA delivering an acoustic tour to promote his album "Nomad". He also took part at the Monster of Rock Cruise in October.

In October 2016, Mike Tramp announced his 10th solo album, titled Maybe Tomorrow, a follow up to his most successful and highest-selling solo album Nomad from 2015.

The album Maybe Tomorrow was released worldwide on 24 February 2017 through Target Records.

In January 2017, Tramp launched a music video for the single "Coming Home", a track from his album Maybe Tomorrow. The video was filmed and edited by Kennie Østed. In February 2017, the song "Would I Lie to You" was released as the second single followed by the third single "Spring" released in May 2017.

Mike and his band of brothers, including Soren Andersen, Claus Langeskov and Kenny Andy, began a tour in March 2017 after three sold-out concerts in Roskilde and Copenhagen for the release of Maybe Tomorrow, also playing to French, Italian and Irish audiences. The tour is also set to visit Germany, Belgium, the UK, and France.

Mike Tramp, has topped the Danish album sales charts (certified by IFPI). The new album, Maybe Tomorrow enters at No. 1 on the vinyl chart and No. 2 on the physical album chart.

In September 2017 Mike Tramp released a music video for a new single titled "Work It All Out" from his upcoming new box set This & That (But A Whole Lot More), which will be released via Mighty Music / Target Group on 1 December 2017.

In February 2018 Tramp provided lead vocals to a friend's project based in Indonesia for the single "One More Chance" which also features a music video.

Mike Tramp toured Europe, Netherlands and Italy in the Spring of 2018 with his Band of Brothers. After that some tour dates followed in May.
In October 2018, Tramp announced that he's been working on a new album released in 2019. To add, he played some Denmark shows with his acoustic guitar in between. On 1 November, Tramp's first solo album "Capricorn" was re-released as a special vinyl version. He also performed 2 shows in Zeppelin Bar, Copenhagen to celebrate that.

2019
On 8 January 2019, Mike Tramp announced that his new solo album titled Stray From The Flock would be released on 1 March. Tramp's record company Target Records made the following statement:

With 100+ shows planned in 2019 to support the new album – starting off in the US in February and March with 22 shows – and a first single, titled "Dead End Ride", ready to drop on 25 January (together with a top-notch video), this will be another great year for Mike Tramp.

On 25 January, Tramp released the song/video "Dead End Ride" as a first single of the new album. The song went No. 1 on iTunes in Peru the next day.

Stray From The Flock was officially released on 1 March 2019 through Mighty Music/Target Records. A second single "Homesick" was released on 29 March and Tramp also released a third single "Best Days Of My Life". The song, also available as a lyric video, was released in connection with his extensive European tour in the Fall of 2019.

2020
On 1 May 2020 Mike Tramp released the album "Second Time Around" through Target Records. The album consists of ten brand new re-recordings from his 2009 album, "The Rock 'N' Roll Circuz".
The new versions were produced by Mike Tramp and Soren Anderson at Medley studios in Copenhagen.

"The Road" which also featured a new music video and "Between Good and Bad (radio single)" were both released as singles in advance. The new version of "When She Cries" was also released as a single following the album's official release, the song was dedicated to his daughter.

In 2020 Mike Tramp celebrated 25 years as a solo artist with the release of the ultimate best-of album: "Trampthology" on 18 December 2020.
The all new best-of album from Tramp will be released on a double gatefold 180-gram vinyl and double CD. The compilation will feature 16 of the biggest hits from his amazing solo career plus four brand new songs including the single "Take Me Away" featuring a lyric video.

2021
In February 2021, Tramp released a brand new single, "Everything Is Alright", as his entry into the Eurovision Song Contest representing Denmark. The song is up against seven other entries, and the winner will be chosen at the Dansk Melodi Grand Prix on 6 March. The Eurovision Song Contest finals will take place in Rotterdam, Netherlands in May. Tramp also released the official music video for "Everything Is Alright" on 18 February 2021 and another compilation album also titled "Everything Is Alright" in May 2021 featuring the single plus the 9 best tracks from Trampthology on a single disc release.

2022
In the new year Tramp released a new single, "You Only Get To Do It Once", on 7 January. An autobiographic reflection the song was created exclusively for Trampthology.com 

In September 2022, Tramp for the first time in his career released a full set of songs sung entirely in Danish on his new album "For Første Gang". The album features music videos for the three singles released: "Min By", "For Første Gang For Altid" and "Vejkort".

In October Tramp announced he would be touring Europe and the USA in 2023 and released another single, "What You Got Left", featuring a video directed by his son. The song features ex White Lion Bassist James Lomenzo.

2023
Mike Tramp has announced the upcoming release of ‘Songs 0f White Lion’, via Frontiers Music Srl on April 14, 2023. 
As the title implies, the new album sees Tramp re-imagining select cuts from his former band White Lion’s catalog. A re-recorded "Cry for Freedom" was released as the first single, followed by a reworked take on "Little Fighter".

Personal life
Tramp is married to Indonesian actress Ayu Azhari, with whom he has two children: Isabel and Lennon. Tramp also has a third child, son Dylan, from a previous relationship with Fleur Thiemeyer. Dylan resides in Australia with his mother. Tramp also has a farm in Denmark with his brother where they raise cattle.
Tramp has been on record as saying he does not believe that planes brought down the World Trade Center on 9/11. "I have 250 books on the subject and every DVD ever released and firmly believe those two planes did not bring down the Twin Towers." On the "Rock Solid Podcast" (14 October 2021) he also indicated that he believed that the "COVID-19 pandemic" had some conspiracies behind it.

Discography

with Mabel
 Another Fine Mess! (Scandinavia) (1977)
 Message From My Heart (Scandinavia) (released as Boom Boom in Germany) (1978)
 Mabel 4-Ever (Germany) (released as Mabel 4 Ever in Denmark) (1978)
 We Are The 80's (Spain) (also released as Nací Para Hacerte Feliz in Spain) (1979)
 Mabel's Største Successer (Denmark) (compilation album) (1979)
 Extraños (Spain) (1981)
 Det Sidste Boom (Denmark) (compilation album) (2009)

with Studs
 Studs (Spain) (1981)

with White Lion
 Fight to Survive (1985)
 Pride (1987)
 Big Game (1989)
 Mane Attraction (1991)
 The Best of White Lion (1992)
 Remembering White Lion (newly recorded versions of previous songs) (1999) (re-released as Last Roar in 2004)
 Rocking The USA (live double album) (2005)
 Anthology 83-89 (demos) (2006)
 The Definitive Rock Collection (2007)
 Return of the Pride (2008)

with Freak of Nature
 Freak of Nature (1993 Re-Issue 2021)
 Gathering of Freaks (1994 Re-Issue 2021)
 Outcasts (compilation album of B-sides, demos, and outtakes) (1998 Re-Issue 2021)
 Freakthology (limited edition box set, featuring all three previous Freak of Nature complete albums) (2003)

Solo discography

Studio albums

Live albums

Compilation albums

Box sets

Singles

Music videos

References

External links

 Mike Tramp's Website
 The Mike Tramp Fansite
 The Mike Tramp French Fansite
 His site at Melodic, including album reviews
 Interview with Mike on Anarchy Music
 Mabel discography and pictures

1961 births
Living people
Danish expatriates in Australia
Danish male singers
Glam metal musicians
Musicians from Copenhagen
White Lion members
Eurovision Song Contest entrants of 1978
Eurovision Song Contest entrants for Denmark
English-language singers from Denmark
Spanish-language singers of Denmark
Frontiers Records artists
Atlantic Records artists